Katarina Erlandsdotter (1771–1848) was a Swedish artist (tapestry maker).

Daughter of the gardener Erland Hallberg and Anna Maria Kristoffersdotter and the sister of Sven Erlandsson (1768–1853) and Lisa Erlandsdotter (1771–1848); the three siblings all became known as artists, and are counted among the most prominent within their craft in 18th-century Sweden. Katarina made bonadsmålning, a Swedish art form, which is a type of painted tapestry of textile used for decoration, largely among the peasantry. 

Katarina lived her entire life in the countryside at Mårdaklev in Älvsborgs län.

References 

  Svenskt konstnärslexikon (Swedish Art dictionary) Allhems Förlag, Malmö (1952) 

1771 births
1848 deaths
People from Svenljunga Municipality
Swedish women artists
Swedish textile artists
18th-century Swedish artists
19th-century women textile artists
19th-century textile artists
18th-century women textile artists
18th-century textile artists